Scopula immistaria is a moth of the  family Geometridae. It is found in Bulgaria, Ukraine and Russia.

Subspecies
Scopula immistaria immistaria
Scopula immistaria beshkovi Gelbrecht & Hausmann, 1997 (Bulgaria)

References

Moths described in 1852
immistaria
Moths of Europe
Moths of Asia